Sport in Delhi have a long and distinguished history. Delhi is the capital territory of India; it has hosted many major international tournaments and has professional teams in different national leagues like Hockey India League, Indian Premier League and Indian Super League.

Delhi Skateboarding 

Delhi Skateboarding team has been the top team in RSFI national championship 2020 and 2021. Delhi team was also top in First India roller games 2022. Players like Shivam Balhara, Aryan rawat, Shivam Tiwari and aadya Aditi have been spearheading Delhi team.since 2018.

Delhi as the host
Delhi has hosted many international sports championships and multi-sports events:
1951 Asian Games — New Delhi hosted the first ever Asian Games
1982 Asian Games — In 1982, New Delhi hosted the ninth edition of the Asian Games
2010 Commonwealth Games — New Delhi became the second Asian city, after Kuala Lumpur, to host the Commonwealth Games
1989 Asian Athletics Championships — New Delhi hosted the Eighth Asian Athletics Chancellorships

Delhi Half Marathon
The Delhi Half Marathon is an annual half marathon foot-race held in New Delhi. Established in 2005, it is both an elite runner and mass participation event. It is an AIMS-certified course and is listed as a Gold Label Road Race by the IAAF. The 2009 event attracted around 29,000 runners who competed in one of the four races: the half marathon, the 7 km Great Delhi Run, a 4.3 km run for senior citizens, and a 3.5 km wheelchair race.

2010 Hockey World Cup

The 2010 Hockey World Cup was the twelfth installment of the Men's Hockey World Cup. New Delhi became first Indian city to host this major event, taking place over two weeks from 28 February – 13 March 2010 at New Delhi's Dhyan Chand National Stadium.

Nehru Cup
The Nehru Cup (more formally known as the ONGC Nehru Cup) due to the competition's sponsorship by ONGC is an international association football tournament organised by the (AIFF). It was launched in 1982, but was not held from 1998 to 2006. After the trophy was won by Iraq in 1997, it was reinstated only in 2007.

Cricket World Cup
Delhi had been one of the host cities of Cricket world cup's three terms held in Indian sub-continent.

Cricket

Cricket, as in whole nation has special place in Delhi also. Cricket is very well organised and established within Delhi and most popular spectator sport. Delhi has several of India's leading cricket clubs. Not only at professional level, cricket is very popular among the people of Delhi.
  
Delhi cricket team is the first-class cricket team of Delhi, that plays in India's domestic competition, the Ranji Trophy. They have won the tournament seven times and have been runners-up seven. In the Duleep and Deodhar Trophy, Delhi comes under the North Zone team.

Delhi is the home of Indian Premier League franchise Delhi Capitals, owned by the GMR Group and JSW Group.

Delhi District Cricket Association (DDCA) is the governing body of cricket in Delhi region. It manages the Feroz Shah Kotla Ground and Rajat Sharma is the current president of DDCA Executive Committee.
DDCA affiliates many cricket clubs in Delhi.

Association football
 
Football is a popular sport in Delhi, perhaps second to cricket. The only football stadium in Delhi is the Ambedkar Stadium which has a total capacity of 20,000 people, and can be expanded up to 50,000 people. Delhi also as Jawaharlal Nehru Stadium, New Delhi, which is used dually for football and athletics both. Delhi hosts the Nehru Cup, international football tournament organised by the All India Football Federation.

This sport has gained immense popularity in the near past and is set to improve also in the near future. The mid-2010s saw many football academies being set up in Delhi as a result of recently gained popularity due to Indian Super League. The FIFA under-17 World Cup, 2017 was a major successful and the only world football event hosted by the city till now.

Delhi is the home of many amateur and professional football club:
Sudeva Delhi FC, the club currently plays in the I-League.
Hindustan Football Club, the club plays in the Delhi Senior Division league. In the 2004/05 season, the club played in the 2nd division of National Football League. Currently the club is trying to qualify for the 2nd round of I-league qualification.

New Delhi Heroes FC, the club currently plays in the Second Division of the I-League.
Former club Delhi Dynamos FC, this professional football club competed in the Indian Super League. (Now shifted to Odisha and rebranded as Odisha FC. So, presently there is no Delhi representative at ISL.)

Tennis

Tennis in Delhi has been played since British Raj. Delhi Lawn Tennis Association is the governing body of tennis in Delhi, its headquarters are located at African Avenue. R.K. Khanna Tennis Complex is the main tennis stadium in Delhi-NCR for the international tournaments. It also hosts the headquarters of the All India Tennis Association, the national governing body of tennis in India.

Basketball
Delhi is home to the Delhi Capitals, 2016 Champion of India's top professional basketball division, the UBA Pro Basketball League.

Swimming 
Swimming is a popular activity in Delhi due to the hot weather. A 2014 news report said that people were willing to queue for seven hours for an opportunity to join a "government-run sports complex, featuring an Olympic-sized swimming pool."

Ground and Stadium

 Ambedkar Stadium
 Bharat Nagar Sports Complex
 Central Secretariat Ground
 Chhatrasal Stadium
 Dayanand Anglo Vedic College Ground
 Delhi University Stadium
 Dussehra Ground
 Dr. Karni Singh Shooting Range
 Feroz Shah Kotla Ground
 Feroz Shah Kotla Ground No 2
 Feroz Shah Kotla Ground No 3
 Gargi College Ground
 Guru Gobind Singh College of Commerce Ground
 Harbax Singh Stadium
 Indira Gandhi Arena
 Indira Gandhi Indoor Stadium
 Jamia Millia Islamia University Ground
 Jawaharlal Nehru Stadium, Delhi
 Karnail Singh Stadium
 Major Dhyan Chand National Stadium
 Najafgarh Stadium, Najafgarh
 Palam A Stadium
 Palam B Stadium
 Rajiv Gandhi Stadium, Bawana
 R.K. Khanna Tennis Complex
 Roshanara Club Ground
 Rohini Sports Complex
 Saket Sports Complex
 Siri Fort Sports Complex
 SPM Swimming Pool Complex
 Talkatora Stadium
 Thyagaraj Sports Complex
 Yamuna Sports Complex

See also
Sport in India
2011 Cricket World Cup
Indian Grand Prix

References

External links
DDCA Official Website
DLTA Official Website